1861 in sports describes the year's events in world sport.

Baseball
National championship
 National Association of Base Ball Players champion – Brooklyn Atlantics
Events
 The National Association establishes the December annual meeting, a change from March, meeting twice during calendar 1860.  Membership slips from 59 to 55 clubs and then the outbreak of the American Civil War in the spring sharply cuts both inter-city travel and the number of matches played in greater New York City.  Some clubs practically disband.

Boxing
Events
 18 June — Jem Mace defeats Sam Hurst in eight rounds at Medway Island to win the Heavyweight Championship of England.  Hurst retires from boxing.
 John C. Heenan retains the Championship of America but there is no record of any fights involving him in 1861.

Cricket
Events
 20 October — the first English team to tour Australia sets sail from Liverpool.  The team is captained by H. H. Stephenson.  No first-class matches are played.
England
 Most runs – Robert Carpenter 883 @ 30.44 (HS 106)
 Most wickets – Edgar Willsher 87 @ 11.65 (BB 8–27)

Football
Events
 Foundation of Richmond FC and Sale Sharks which are two of the oldest senior rugby union clubs

Golf
Major tournaments
 British Open – Tom Morris senior

Horse racing
Events
 The inaugural running of the Melbourne Cup in Australia is won by Archer.  The Melbourne Cup is a race for three-year-olds and above, over a distance of 3,200 metres (approximately two miles).
England
 Grand National – Jealousy
 1,000 Guineas Stakes – Nemesis
 2,000 Guineas Stakes – Diophantus
 The Derby – Kettledrum
 The Oaks – Brown Duchess
 St. Leger Stakes – Caller Ou
Australia
 Melbourne Cup – Archer
Canada
 Queen's Plate – Wild Irishman

Rowing
The Boat Race
 23 March — Oxford wins the 18th Oxford and Cambridge Boat Race
Other events
 Harvard–Yale Regatta – not contested 1861 to 1863

References

 
Sports by year